Julio Cesar Larrea Flores or Julio Larrea (born March 2, 1987) is a Paraguayan footballer who currently plays as a striker and midfielder for Bhayangkara F.C. in Indonesia Super League.

Club

Persebaya ISL
On 6 March 2014 Julio Larrea has officially joined the Persebaya ISL for the duration of one season with the Rp 700 million contract.

References

External links

Profile at ligaindonesia.co.id 

1987 births
Living people
Paraguayan footballers
Paraguayan expatriate footballers
Association football midfielders
Paraguayan expatriate sportspeople in Indonesia
Expatriate footballers in Indonesia
Liga 1 (Indonesia) players
Persebaya Surabaya players